A Future Without a Past... is the debut studio album from American hip hop group Leaders of the New School. It was released in 1991 on Elektra Records.

Production
A Future Without a Past... is a loose concept album about high school, divided into three parts.

Critical reception
Stanton Swihart of AllMusic praised the work, calling the group's debut "one of the most infectious rap albums ever created." Trouser Press called the album "highly amiable," writing that the group's "subtle Afrocentric politics came coated in tasty upbeat rhymes." Complex wrote that the album revives "the barbershop quartet-style group dynamics of early hip-hop crews like the Treacherous 3 and the Cold Crush Brothers." Fact called it "a jolly throwback affair ... enlivened by Busta’s freewheeling presence and some smart production work."

Track listing

Charts

Personnel
assistant engineering – John Gamble
engineering – Dr. Shane Faber, Mike Mangini, Christopher Shaw
mixing – Busta Rhymes, Charlie Brown, Geeby Dajani, John Gamble, Dante Ross, Eric "Vietnam" Sadler
production – Busta Rhymes, Charlie Brown, Cut Monitor Milo, Geeby Dajani, Dinco D, John Gamble, Leaders of the New School, Dante Ross, Eric "Vietnam" Sadler

Notes

External links
 A Future Without a Past... at Discogs

1991 debut albums
Elektra Records albums
Leaders of the New School albums
Albums produced by Dante Ross
Albums produced by John Gamble (record producer)